Camila Ashland (March 24, 1911 – September 12, 2008) was an American actress, best known for her role in V and V The Final Battle.  Also as Minnie Du Val in  Dark Shadows. Ashland was nominated for a Tony Award for Best Featured Actress in a Play for her performance in Black Comedy/White Lies in 1967.

Career
Ashland also starred on the soap opera General Hospital as Alice Grant from 1976–77, and in the 1983 NBC miniseries V and its 1984 sequel, V: The Final Battle, in which she played Ruby Engels. She made guest appearances on The Golden Girls, Cheers, St. Elsewhere, Hardcastle and McCormick, and Taxi.

Her film credits include Any Which Way You Can and 10. She appeared in 11 Broadway productions, including Darling of the Day (1968), Dear World, Follies (1971), and a 1973 Broadway revival of The Women.

Personal life
Ashland was married to James Vincent Russo, a Broadway director, with whom she adopted a son, Walter Russo.

Filmography

References

External links
 
 

1911 births
2008 deaths
20th-century American actresses
American film actresses
American stage actresses
American musical theatre actresses
American soap opera actresses
American television actresses
Hollywood blacklist
20th-century American singers
20th-century American women singers
21st-century American women